Judy Klassen is a Canadian provincial politician, who was interim leader of the Manitoba Liberal Party, from October 2016 to June 2017, succeeding Rana Bokhari. Klassen was first elected as the Member of the Legislative Assembly of Manitoba for the riding of Keewatinook (then spelled Kewatinook) in the 2016 provincial election. She defeated incumbent New Democratic Party (NDP) MLA and Deputy Premier Eric Robinson in a closely contested race.

In April 2019, Klassen announced she would not be seeking re-election in Keewatinook, instead seeking the federal Liberal nomination for the riding of Churchill—Keewatinook Aski in the 2019 federal election. In July 2019, Klassen was acclaimed as the Liberal candidate. Her provincial riding covered much of the eastern portion of the federal riding. However, she lost by an over two-to-one margin to incumbent Niki Ashton of the NDP.

Klassen grew up in St. Theresa Point First Nation and has a business studies diploma from Red River College in Steinbach.

Electoral history

2019 Canadian federal election

2016 Manitoba general election

References

External links
 Judy Klassen at The Legislative Assembly of Manitoba

Living people
Manitoba Liberal Party MLAs
Women MLAs in Manitoba
First Nations women in politics
People from Steinbach, Manitoba
21st-century Canadian politicians
21st-century Canadian women politicians
Year of birth missing (living people)
First Nations politicians
People from Northern Region, Manitoba
Liberal Party of Canada candidates for the Canadian House of Commons